The Upper Lusatian Gefilde ( or sometimes Bautzener Gefilde, Upper Sorbian: Hornjołužiska pahórčina) is a natural region in Saxony near the German tripoint with the Czech Republic and Poland. It is considered part of the Saxon Loess Fields and the Western Sudetes range. Gefilde is German for "fields" or "country".

References

Literature
 Karl Mannsfeld, Hans Richter (ed.): Naturräume in Sachsen. Trier, 1995.
 Rochus Schrammek: Verkehrs- und Baugeschichte der Stadt Bautzen. Bautzen, 1984.

External links 
 Regional grouping, sub-grouping and overview map as part of the planning region of Upper Lusatia-Lower Silesia, retrieved 11 March 2012

Natural regions of Saxony
Upper Lusatia